The following is a list of Looney Tunes television series and compilation shows.

List of shows

Compilations

Original shows 
Note: All shows produced by Warner Bros. Animation unless other wise noted.

Cameo appearance in other television series

See also 
 Looney Tunes and Merrie Melodies filmography
 List of Looney Tunes feature films

Notes

References 

Lists of animated television series